The , also known as the Upheaval of Ōnin and Ōnin-Bunmei war, was a civil war that lasted from 1467 to 1477, during the Muromachi period in Japan. Ōnin refers to the Japanese era during which the war started; the war ended during the Bunmei era. A dispute between a high official, Hosokawa Katsumoto, and a regional lord, Yamana Sōzen, escalated into a nationwide civil war involving the Ashikaga shogunate and a number of daimyō in many regions of Japan.

The war initiated the Sengoku period, "the Warring States period". This period was a long, drawn-out struggle for domination by individual daimyō, resulting in a mass power-struggle between the various houses to dominate the whole of Japan.

Origin

The Ōnin conflict began as a controversy over who would succeed shōgun Ashikaga Yoshimasa. In 1464, Yoshimasa had no heir. He persuaded his younger brother, Ashikaga Yoshimi, to abandon the life of a monk, and named him heir. In 1465, the unanticipated birth of a son to Yoshimasa put these plans in question. The infant, Yoshihisa, led to a succession crisis with two competing factions. On one side was the shōgun and his brother, together with the shōgun's deputy, Hosokawa. On the other side was Yoshihisa's mother, Hino Tomiko, and her ally Yamana, who was the governor of several provinces.

Tomiko sought political and military support to rule as regent until the birth of her son, the future shogun Ashikaga Yoshihisa. She secured the support of Yamana Sōzen and other leaders of powerful samurai clans. In contrast to Tomiko and Yamana, Yoshimi had the support of the Hosokawa clan, a powerful clan that had a great influence on the shogunate court. This dispute for succession started the Ōnin War and led to the beginning of the Sengoku period.

Hosokawa had always worked closely with the shōguns brother Ashikaga Yoshimi, and supported his claim to the shogunate. Yamana took this as an opportunity to oppose Hosokawa further, supporting the child as heir to the shogunate. War broke out in the city of Kyoto. This was regarded by the Ashikaga shōgun as an act of rebellion, and thus the Ashikaga and their supporters were forced to try to stop it. The Ashikagas tried to prevent the outbreak of war over the next heir, but the situation escalated into a war that designated the leader of the victorious party as the next shōgun. In 1467 the uncertainty had caused a split amongst the warrior clans, and the succession dispute became a pretext for a struggle for military supremacy. In the end, there was no clear-cut winner. The complex array of factional armies simply fought themselves into exhaustion.

Battles

Hosokawa's Eastern Army of about 85,000 and Yamana's Western Army of about 80,000 were almost evenly matched when mobilized near Kyoto.  The fighting started in March when a Hosokawa mansion was burned.  Then in May 1467, a Yamana mansion was attacked.  In July, according to Sansom, Yoshimasa appointed Hosokawa commanding general in an attempt to "chastise the rebel" Yamana.  Sansom states "heavy fighting continued throughout July" and "several hundred large buildings were destroyed, and destruction continued day after day".  Hosokawa was soon cornered in the northeast portion of Kyoto around his mansion, while Yamana controlled the south and west.  Yamana received 20,000 reinforcements under Ōuchi Masahiro in September.  However, Sansom states Hosokawa was able to bring the "sovereign and the abdicated Emperor" to the Bakufu from the Emperor's Palace, before it was seized by Yamana with 50,000 men.  Hosokawa then received Akamatsu troops as reinforcements.  On 1 November, Yamana was able to capture the Shōkoku-ji after bribing a monk.  Sansom states "The chronicles of the time paint a dreadful picture of the carnage", and "the two adversaries faced one another without action for the rest of the year".

Hosokawa attempted an attack on New Years Day, and then again in April, but for the most part "the two armies now remained glaring at one another month after month".  A central trench ten feet deep and twenty feet wide separated the two armies.  Several monasteries were burned, including the Tenryū-ji.  Finally, Yoshimi went to the side of Yamana, forcing the shōgun to name his son Yoshihisa as his heir in 1469.  In a strange switch of allegiances, the war became one of brother against brother.  The Emperor Go-Tsuchimikado stripped "Yoshimi of his court ranks" and declared him a rebel.

Both Yamana Sōzen and Hosokawa Katsumoto died in 1473, and even then the war continued on, with neither side able to figure out how to end it. However, eventually the Yamana clan lost heart as the label of "rebel" was at last having some effect. Ōuchi Masahiro, one of the Yamana generals, eventually burnt down his section of Kyoto and left the area on 17 December 1477.

By 1477, ten years after the fighting had begun, Kyoto was nothing more than a place for mobs to loot and move in to take what was left. Neither the Yamana clan nor the Hosokawa clan had achieved its aims, other than to whittle down the numbers of the opposing clan.

During this ordeal, the shōgun was not instrumental in alleviating the situation. While Kyoto was burning, Ashikaga Yoshimasa spent his time in poetry readings and other cultural activities, and in planning Ginkaku-ji, a Silver Pavilion to rival Kinkaku-ji, the Golden Pavilion that his grandfather, Ashikaga Yoshimitsu, had built.

The Ōnin War, and the shōguns complacent attitude towards it, "sanctioned" private wars and skirmishes between the other daimyō. No part of Japan escaped the violence.  Although the battles in Kyoto had been abandoned, the war had spread to the rest of Japan. In Yamashiro Province, the Hatakeyama clan had split into two parts that fought each other to a standstill. This stalemate was to have serious consequences. In 1485, the peasantry and jizamurai (lesser samurai – mostly armed peasants) had had enough, and revolted. They organized the Yamashiro ikki and forced the clan armies to leave the province. The ikki became a powerful force, much more than simply an armed mob. By 1486 they had even set up a provisional government for Yamashiro province.

Other ikki would form and appear throughout other parts of Japan, such as Kaga Province, where a sect of the Jōdo Shinshū Buddhists, the Ikkō, started their own revolt during the Ōnin War after being enlisted by one of Kaga's most prominent warlords, Togashi Masachika. The Ikkō, who had a complex relationship with the Jōdo Shinshō leader Rennyo, appealed to the common peasants in their region, and inevitably formed the Ikkō-ikki. By 1488 the Ikkō-ikki of Kaga Province overthrew Masachika and took control of the province. After this they began building a fortified castle-cathedral along the Yodo River and used it as their headquarters.

The uprising of the Ikkō-ikki and the Yamashiro-ikki formed part of the general outbreak of civil war.  Sansom states some refer to this as gekokujō (roughly "the low oppress the high"), or a "disturbed social order".  Sansom further states, "The frequent risings of the fifteenth century were expressions of popular discontent in which peasants took part".

Aftermath

After the Ōnin War, the Ashikaga bakufu completely fell apart; for all practical purposes, the Hosokawa family was in charge and the Ashikaga shōguns became their puppets. When Yoshimi's son Yoshitane was made shōgun in 1490, the Hosokawa Kanrei (deputy) soon put him to flight in 1493 and declared another Ashikaga, Yoshizumi, to be shōgun. In 1499, Yoshitane arrived at Yamaguchi, the capital of the Ōuchi, and this powerful family threw its military support behind Yoshitane.

In 1507, the Kanrei Hosokawa Masamoto was assassinated and in 1508, Yoshizumi left Kyoto and the Ōuchi restored the shogunate to Yoshitane. Thence began a series of strange conflicts over control of the puppet government of the shogunate. After the death of Hosokawa Matsumoto, his adopted sons Takakuni and Sumimoto began to fight over the succession to the Kanrei, but Sumimoto himself was a puppet of one of his vassals. This would characterize the wars following the Ōnin War; these wars were more about control over puppet governments than they were about high ideals or simply greed for territory.

The Hosokawa family controlled the shogunate until 1558 when they were betrayed by a vassal family, the Miyoshi. The powerful Ōuchi were also destroyed by a vassal, Mōri Motonari, in 1551.

By the end of the Warring States period only a dozen or so warlord families remained. The most important development to come out of the Ōnin War was the ceaseless civil war that ignited outside the capital city. Hosokawa tried to foment civil strife in the Ōuchi domains, for instance, and this civil strife would eventually force Ōuchi to submit and leave. From the close of the Ōnin War, this type of civil strife, either vassals striving to conquer their daimyō or succession disputes drawing in outside daimyō, was endemic all throughout Japan.

Scholars disagree on the appropriateness of the term "Warring States period" (which is the Chinese term borrowed by the Japanese in calling this period sengoku jidai). Many argue that since Japan was essentially intact, the Emperor and shogunate remaining at least nominally in command of the whole country, and that it really wasn't a "warring states" period at all, but a "warring warlords" period. Others such as Mark Ravina, Mary Elizabeth Berry, and Conrad Totman argue that the kuni (provinces) were not unlike quasi-independent states, and that the term is thus more or less appropriate.

The cost for the individual daimyō was tremendous, and a century of conflict so weakened the bulk of Japanese warlords that the three great figures of Japanese unification, beginning with Oda Nobunaga, found it easier to militarily assert a single, unified military government.

Kyoto
Kyoto was devastated by the war, not really recovering until the mid-16th century. The city has not seen such widespread destruction since, being spared the strategic bombing of Japanese cities during World War II. In Kyoto, "pre-war" refers to the Ōnin War, rather than World War II.

Ōnin Ki
The Ōnin Ki (応仁記) is a document written sometime from the end of the 15th century to the middle of the 16th century (i.e. some 20 to 80 years after the conflict), which describes the causes and effects of the Ōnin War. It illustrates in detail the strategies involved in the fighting, and its chief instigators, Yamana Sōzen and Hosokawa Katsumoto, along with accounts of how the Onin War affected the city and its citizens:

"The flowery capitol which we thought would last forever to our surprise is to become a lair of wolves and foxes. Even the North Field of Toji has fallen to ash ... Lamenting the plight of the many fallen acolytes, Ii-o Hikorokusaemon-No-Jou read a passage:

Nare ya shiru
Miyako wa nobe no
Yū-hibari
Agaru wo mite mo
Ochiru na-mida wa

Now the city that you knew
Has become an empty moor,
From which the evening skylark rises
While your tears fall."

Chronology
The origins of the Ōnin conflict are manifold. To say that the war began with a quarrel between angry warlords is too simplistic. The initial phase of this decade-long struggle "was only a spark which set fire to a broader conflagration". Without fully anticipating the consequences, the Muromachi government had loosened the restraints of tradition in Japanese society, which meant that "new energies were released, new classes were formed, and new wealth was created". As the shogunate's powerful figures competed for influence in Kyoto, the leading families in the provinces were amassing resources and growing more independent of centralized controls.

Precursors
 1443 Ashikaga Yoshimasa becomes shōgun.
 1445 Hosokawa Katsumoto becomes Kyoto kanrei.
 1449 Ashikaga Shigeuji assumes office in the Kantō.
 1457 Ōta Dōkan builds Edo Castle. Ashikaga Masatomo sent to govern the Kantō.
 1458 Yoshimasa builds a new Muromachi palace.
 1464 Yoshimasa decided to abdicate his position as Shogun to his brother Ashikaga Yoshimi. Hino Tomiko was against the decision and goes in search of military support for her future son to succeed the shogunate.
 1465 Hino Tomiko gives birth to Ashikaga Yoshihisa and calls herself regent to her son.
 1466 Yamana Sōzen and Hosokawa Katsumoto gather troops near Kyoto.

Warfare begins
 1467 Outbreak of the Ōnin War. Yamana is declared a rebel. In November, the Shōkoku-ji is destroyed.
 1468 Yoshimi goes over to Yamana's side.
 1469 Yoshimasa names Yoshihisa his heir.
 1471 Ikkō-ikki Buddhist sect gains strength in the North. Asakura Toshikage becomes Constable (shugo) of Echizen.
 1473 Yamana and Hosokawa die. Yoshimasa retires.
 1477 Ōuchi clan leaves Kyoto. End of the Ōnin War.

Sequel
 1485 Agrarian uprisings in Yamashiro.
 1489 Yoshihisa dies.
 1490 Yoshimasa dies. Ashikaga Yoshitane becomes shōgun.
 1492 Hōjō Sōun becomes master of Izu.
 1493 Yoshitane abdicates.
 1494 Hosokawa Masamoto becomes Kyoto kanrei.
 1495 Sōun captures Odawara.
1496 Hino Tomiko dies.
 1508 Ōuchi restores Yoshitane.
 1545 Hōjō Ujiyasu defeats the Uesugi clan forces at Kawagoe.
 1551 Mōri defeats the Ōuchi led by Sue Harukata at the Battle of Miyajima.
 1554 Mōri succeeds to Ōuchi lands and power.
 1555 Uesugi Kenshin and Takeda Shingen fight at Kawanakajima
 1560 Victory of Oda Nobunaga at Okehazama.

See also
Higashiyama period
List of wars
Military history of Japan

References

Works cited

Ackroyd, Joyce. (1982) Lessons from History: The Tokushi Yoron. Brisbane: University of Queensland Press.  
Ravina, Mark (1995). "State Building and Political Economy in Early Modern Japan," Journal of Asian Studies, 54:4, 997–1022.
Turnbull, Stephen R. (1996). The Samurai: A Military History.. London: Routledge. 
Varley, H. Paul. (1973).   Japanese Culture: A Short History. London: Farber and Farber. ; OCLC 2542423

External links

1460s conflicts
1470s conflicts
1460s in Japan
1470s in Japan
1467 in Asia
1477 in Asia
15th century in Japan
Ashikaga clan
Keichō-Hosokawa clan
Military history of feudal Japan
Wars involving Japan
Wars of succession involving the states and peoples of Asia